Zubiena is a comune (municipality) in the Province of Biella in the Italian region Piedmont, located about  northeast of Turin and about  southwest of Biella.

Zubiena borders the following municipalities: Borriana, Cerrione, Magnano, Mongrando, Sala Biellese, Torrazzo.

References

Cities and towns in Piedmont